Twice the Speed of Life is the debut studio album by American country music group Sugarland, released on October 26, 2004, through Mercury Nashville Records. The album peaked at number 16 on the Billboard 200 and number three on the Top Country Albums charts. It was certified triple platinum by the Recording Industry Association of America (RIAA). The album features the singles "Baby Girl", "Something More", "Just Might (Make Me Believe)", and "Down in Mississippi (Up to No Good)", which peaked at number 2, number 2, number 7, and number 17 respectively on the Billboard Hot Country Songs charts. Twice the Speed of Life was Sugarland's only album as a trio, before Kristen Hall left in December 2005.

Singles
On July 12, 2004, the first single "Baby Girl" was released. The song reached number 38 on the Billboard Hot 100 and number two on the Hot Country Songs charts. It was also certified gold by the Recording Industry Association of America (RIAA). "Something More" is the second single from the album. It was released on April 11, 2005. The song peaked at number 35 on the Billboard Hot 100 and number two on the Hot Country Albums charts. It was also certified gold by the RIAA. "Just Might (Make Me Believe)" was released on September 15, 2005, it peaked at number 60 on the Billboard Hot 100 and number seven on the Hot Country Songs charts. It was also certified gold. The album's last single "Down in Mississippi (Up to No Good)" was released on March 13, 2006. Unlike the album's other singles, the song failed to chart on the Hot 100 but peaked at number 17 on the Hot Country Songs chart respectively.

Accolades
The group received a nomination for Best New Artist at the Grammy Awards of 2006. They were also nominated for New Artist of the Year at the 2005 American Music Awards. In 2006, the group was also nominated for New Vocal Duo or Group of the Year at the 2006 Country Music Association Awards.

Commercial performance
Twice the Speed of Life peaked at number 16 on the US Billboard 200 and number three on the Top Country Albums charts. The album spent a total of 92 weeks on the Billboard 200 and 104 weeks on the Top Country Albums chart. The album was eventually certified triple platinum by the Recording Industry Association of America (RIAA) for sales of over three million copies in the United States.

Track listing

Personnel
As listed in liner notes.

Sugarland
Kristian Bush – background vocals (except 9), mandolin (except 3), acoustic guitar (3)
Kristen Hall – background vocals (all tracks), acoustic guitar (all tracks)
Jennifer Nettles – lead vocals (all tracks), background vocals (2,3,5-9)

Additional musicians
Tom Bukovac – electric guitar (1,2,4-8), acoustic guitar (3)
Steve Brewster – percussion (9)
Brandon Bush – organ (1,2,5,7-9), electric piano (3,6)
Chad Cromwell – drums (2)
Dan Dugmore – pedal steel guitar (1,2,4-6,8-10), lap steel guitar (2), acoustic guitar (9,11), electric guitar (2), Dobro (3), banjo (9)
Garth Fundis – background vocals (5)
Rob Hajacos – fiddle (4,6,7,11)
Greg Morrow – drums (except 2 and 11), percussion (3), tambourine (2,4,7,8), shaker (7), maracas (8)
Dave Pomeroy – bass guitar (4,7)
Garrison Starr – background vocals (9)
Kenny Vaughan – electric guitar (10)
Glenn Worf – bass guitar (1-3,5,6,8-10)

Charts

Weekly charts

Year-end charts

Certifications

References

2004 debut albums
Albums produced by Garth Fundis
Mercury Nashville albums 
Sugarland albums